Dr. Goldfoot and the Bikini Machine is a 1965 American International Pictures comedy film, made in Pathécolor, directed by Norman Taurog. It stars Vincent Price, Frankie Avalon, Dwayne Hickman, Susan Hart and Jack Mullaney, and features Fred Clark. It is a parody of the then-popular spy film trend (the title is a spoof of two James Bond films: the 1962 film Dr. No and the 1964 hit Goldfinger), made using actors from AIP's beach party and Edgar Allan Poe films.

Despite its low production values, the film has achieved a certain cult status for the appearance of horror legend Vincent Price and AIP's beach party film alumni, its in-jokes and over-the-top sexuality, the claymation title sequence designed by Art Clokey, and a title song performed by The Supremes.

The movie was retitled Dr G. and the Bikini Machine in England due to a threatened lawsuit from Eon, holder of the rights to the James Bond movies.

The success of the film on its 1965 release led to a sequel, made the following year, entitled Dr. Goldfoot and the Girl Bombs.

Plot
Price plays the titular mad scientist who, with the questionable assistance of his resurrected flunky Igor, builds a gang of female robots who are then dispatched to seduce and rob wealthy men. Avalon and Hickman play the bumbling heroes who attempt to thwart Goldfoot's scheme. The film's climax is an extended chase through the streets of San Francisco.

Cast

 Vincent Price as Dr. Goldfoot
 Frankie Avalon as Craig Gamble
 Dwayne Hickman as Todd Armstrong
 Susan Hart as Diane
 Jack Mullaney as Igor
 Fred Clark as D. J. Pevney
 Alberta Nelson as Reject No. 12
 Milton Frome as Motorcycle cop
 Hal Riddle as Newsvendor
 Joe Ploski as Cook

Robots
 Patti Chandler
 Mary Hughes	
 Salli Sachse
 Luree Holmes
 Sue Hamilton
 Laura Nicholson
 Marianne Gaba
 China Lee
 Issa Arnal

 Deanna Lund
 Pamela Rodgers
 Leslie Summers
 Sally Frei
 Kay Michaels
 Jan Watson
 Arlene Charles

Cameos
 Harvey Lembeck
 Deborah Walley
 Aron Kincaid
 Annette Funicello

Cast notes
 Frankie Avalon and Dwayne Hickman play the same characters they did in the previous year's Ski Party, except that the characters' names were swapped.
 Annette Funicello makes a brief cameo appearance as a girl locked in medieval stocks in Dr. Goldfoot's lair. Frankie Avalon lifts her head, then looks at the camera and says, "It can't be!"  Pregnant with her first child at the time, Funicello was placed in the stocks in order to hide her stomach.
 Harvey Lembeck also makes a cameo appearance as his Eric Von Zipper character, enchained along with his motorcycle in Goldfoot's lair. Lembeck also appeared as Goldfoot's assistant, Hugo, in the TV special The Wild Weird World of Dr. Goldfoot.
 Among the girls who play Goldfoot's robots are Deanna Lund, three years before joining the cast of Irwin Allen's science fiction series Land of the Giants; China Lee, a former Playboy Playmate married to Mort Sahl; Luree Holmes and Laura Nicholson, the daughters of James H. Nicholson; and Alberta Nelson, who was also in all seven of AIP's Beach Party films as a member of Eric Von Zipper's motorcycle gang, The Rat Pack.

Production

Development
The original idea for this motion picture came from James H. Nicholson, the President of American International Pictures, who wanted to showcase the versatile talents of AIP contract player Susan Hart. Nicholson provided the story, and is credited as "James Hartford". He hired Robert Kaufman to write the first draft. Director Norman Taurog hired Elwood Ullman to do a rewrite, and Taurog remained intimately involved with the content. Deke Heyward later claimed, without substantiation, that he completely rewrote Robert Kaufman's script.

The original title was announced as Dr Goldfoot and the Sex Machine, and the film was to be directed by William Asher. Taurog shortly thereafter assumed the helm as director, and Dwayne Hickman joined the cast. Filming began in late summer 1965, with one of AIP's largest-ever budgets. It was the first AIP movie to cost over a million dollars.

Vincent Price stated in a 1987 interview with David Del Valle that the original script was a camp musical, comparing it to Little Shop of Horrors. Price stated, "It could have been fun, but they cut all the music out", though it is not clear whether the footage was actually shot or the idea was abandoned during production. According to Susan Hart:

One of the best scenes I've seen on film was Vincent Price singing about the bikini machine – it was excellent. And I was told it was taken out because Sam Arkoff thought that Vincent Price looked too fey. But his character was fey! By taking that particular scene out, I believe they took the explanation and the meat out of that picture... It was a really unique explanatory scene and Vincent Price was beautiful in it, right on the money.

According to Norman Taurog's biographer:

The original plan had been to follow the AIP formula and have songs integrated throughout the film, but Norman brought in Elwood Ullman to do a rewrite ... and the final script read like a good-natured spoof on the James Bond films with no songs. This apparently disappointed Vincent Price, who had been looking forward to singing.

Shooting
The film is notable for its scenic photography of San Francisco. The streetcar scene was filmed at the West Portal tunnel. Filming went for over 30 days, taking place on location in San Francisco and on the backlots at the Producers Studio and Metro-Goldwyn-Mayer Studios. The day after the company returned from San Francisco, rioting broke out in Watts in South Los Angeles. On August 30, the unit moved to MGM Studios Lot 2 to shoot on their "New York Street" set for a couple of days before returning to the Producers Studio.

The climactic chase sequence was filmed in the Bay Area. The stuntmen included Carey Loftin, Paul Stader, Troy Melton, Jerry Summers, Ronnie Ron-dell, Bob Harris, Louis Elias, David Sharpe, Harvey Parry, and Bill Hickman.

When designing Goldfoot's lair, Daniel Haller re-used some of his designs from 1961's The Pit and the Pendulum.  Stock footage of battleships from another AIP release, Godzilla vs. The Thing appears during the climax.

Susan Hart's hair was done by Jon Peters.

Accident
During filming in Los Angeles, the city was gripped by a heatwave. On the afternoon of August 15, 1965, the company was returning from lunch when one of the electricians, Roy Hicks, passed out from the heat and fell to his death from a catwalk.

Theme song
The theme song was recorded by The Supremes as a single-sided unreleased promotional single.

Reception
The film had its premiere at the Golden Gate Theatre in San Francisco, where Nicholson had been a manager. The key cast members embarked on a 30-day tour of 18 cities in 13 countries to promote the film.

Box office
According to Norman Taurog's biographer, the film "was a moderate success in the United States, but did quite well in Europe, particularly in Italy".

Critical response 
The Los Angeles Times said the film "has enough fresh, amusing gags to make it entertaining... Price is splendid".

Sequel
AIP Television produced a musical TV special episode promoting Doctor Goldfoot and the Bikini Machine that appeared for one night in temporary place of the ABC scheduled show Shindig! This show, called The Wild Weird World of Dr. Goldfoot, starred Vincent Price, Tommy Kirk and Susan Hart, and featured many songs that may have been cut from the cinema release. Louis M. Heyward and Stanley Ross wrote the 30-minute short comedy musical TV special which aired Nov 18, 1965 on the ABC network.

In July 1965, a sequel was announced to be made the following year called Dr. Goldfoot for President, to begin filming on May 14, 1966 for a September 14 release. Vincent Price returned for the 1966 sequel, Dr. Goldfoot and the Girl Bombs, directed by Mario Bava.

See also
 List of American films of 1965

References
Notes

External links
 
 
 
 
 
 Dr Goldfoot and the Bikini Machine at Brian's Drive-in Theatre

1965 films
1960s science fiction comedy films
1960s spy comedy films
American robot films
American science fiction comedy films
1960s teen films
1960s parody films
American International Pictures films
1960s English-language films
Films directed by Norman Taurog
Films scored by Les Baxter
Films set in San Francisco
Mad scientist films
American teen comedy films
Bikinis
Beach party films
Parody films based on James Bond films
1965 comedy films
Films shot in San Francisco
1960s American films